Rodney Sebastian Clark Donalds (born November 27, 1969), better known by his stage name El Chombo, is a Panamanian reggaeton artist and producer. He is best known for the hit songs "Chacarron Macarron" and "Dame Tu Cosita", which both became Internet memes.

Works
His major local hits under his own name include "Kung Fu", "El Gato Volador", "Chacarron Macarron" and "Dame Tu Cosita" (which features Jamaican dancehall musician Cutty Ranks). 

As a producer, El Chombo is best known for producing Lorna's 2003 hit single "Papi chulo... (te traigo el mmmm...)", which served as an introduction of reggaeton for many Europeans, reaching number one on the French charts with top ten appearances in Greece, Italy, India, Turkey and the Netherlands. He also released an EP called Macarron Chacarron containing many mixes of his hits. 

In 2006, there was a campaign on BBC Radio 1 in the UK to get the song "Chacarron Macarron" to number one; in the end, it only reached number 20 on the UK Singles Chart.

In March 2018, "Dame Tu Cosita" became a viral Internet dance challenge and meme.

Discography

Albums
Spanish Oil series Spanish Oil 1 (1995)
 Spanish Oil 2 (1996)
 Spanish Oil 3 (1997)
 Spanish Oil 4 (1998)
 Spanish Oil 5 (1999)
 Spanish Oil Plus (1999)Cuentos de la Cripta
 Cuentos de la Cripta 1 (1996)
 Cuentos de la Cripta 2 (1997)
 Cuentos de la Cripta 3 (1999)
 Cuentos de la Cripta Remixes (2001)
 Cuentos de la Cripta 4 (2003)
 Cuentos de la Cripta Platinum (2004)
La Mafia series
 La Mafia 1 (2000)
 La Mafia 2 (2001)
El Chombo and Predikador
 El Chombo and Predikador – ReggaeMania Vol. 1 (2003)
 El Chombo and Predikador – Expedientes Vol. 4 (2004)
 El Chombo and Predikador – Criptonita Vol. 2 (2004)
 El Chombo and Predikador – Súper Galleta Vol. 2 (2004)
 El Chombo and Predikador – La Dinastía
Others
 El Chombo featuring Deenovo – Planet Ganja Vol. 1 (1999)
 La Banda (2000)
 El Chombo and DJ Pablito – El Imperio (2000)
 El Chombo and DJ Pablito – El Pentágono 2 (2000)
 Apocalipsis (2002)
 El Chombo and Andy Van Attes – Expedientes 2 (2001)
 El Chombo and Andy Van Attes – Expedientes 3 (2002)
 Super Galleta (2002)
 La Criptonita (2003)
 La Criptonita V3.03 (2007)

Singles

As lead artist

As producer

Reference notes

References

External links
El Chombo's homepage
[ AllMusic]
Top40-charts.com

1969 births
Panamanian reggaeton musicians
Panamanian people of American descent
Living people
People from Dallas
Panamanian record producers
Epic Records artists
Ultra Records artists